The 2018 Arizona Attorney General election took place on November 6, 2018, to elect the attorney general of Arizona.

Incumbent Attorney General Mark Brnovich won re-election to a second term, defeating former Arizona Department of Health Services Director January Contreras Primaries took place on August 28, 2018.

Republican primary 
Brnovich won the Republican primary unopposed.

Democratic primary 
January Contreras, former director of Arizona Department of Health Services and senior advisor to former U.S. Homeland Security Secretary Janet Napolitano, won the Democratic primary unopposed.

Libertarian primary 
Michael Kielsky, former Chair of the Arizona Libertarian Party, won the Libertarian nomination as a write-in candidate.

General election

Debate 
One debate was hosted by Arizona PBS on October 10.

Polling

Results 
Brnovich won the general election by a 3.47% margin of victory.

References 

Arizona
Attorney General
Arizona Attorney General elections